KYFM (100.1 FM) is a radio station licensed to Bartlesville, Oklahoma.  The station broadcasts an adult contemporary format and is owned by KCD Enterprises, Inc. KYFM also airs a classical music format on 100.1 HD-2.

References

External links
Bright Star 100.1's website

Mainstream adult contemporary radio stations in the United States
YFM